Son is a town in the Dutch province of North Brabant, in the municipality of Son en Breugel. The nearest major city is Eindhoven.

History 
The village was first mentioned in 1107 as Sunna, and might mean creek. Son developed in the Middle Ages along the Dommel River, and has a triangular market square.

The church tower dates from around 1500. The matching church burnt down in 1958 and demolished in 1962. In 1960, the St Petrus church was built as a replacement, but at some distance from the tower. Son was home to 391 people in 1840.

During World War II, it was the site of a bridge, the capture of which was crucial to the success of Operation Market Garden in September 1944. The bridge itself was featured in the 1977 war film A Bridge Too Far.

Gallery

References 

Populated places in North Brabant
Son en Breugel